Ted Kennedy (1932–2009) was a U.S. Senator from Massachusetts.

Ted Kennedy  may also refer to:

Ted Kennedy (ice hockey) (1925–2009), Canadian Hall of Fame ice hockey player
Ted Kennedy (priest) (1931–2005), Australian priest
Ted Kennedy (baseball) (1865–1907), American baseball player
Ted Kennedy (footballer) (1877–1948), Australian rules footballer

See also
Ed Kennedy (disambiguation)
Edward Kennedy (disambiguation)